Kinji Akagawa (born 1940, Tokyo, Japan) is an American sculptor, printmaker, and arts educator best known for sculptural constructions that also serve a practical function.  A pioneer in the public art movement, Akagawa has throughout his career examined the relationship between art and community, most notably the concept of art as a process of inquiry. His sculpture and public artworks are noted for their refined elegance and use of natural materials, such as granite, basalt, field stone, cedar, and ipe wood.

Akagawa trained at the Cranbrook Academy of Art, Bloomfield Hills, Michigan; Tamarind Lithography Workshop, Los Angeles; the Minneapolis College of Art and Design; and the University of Minnesota, Minneapolis, where he earned an MFA degree in 1969.

From 1973 to 2009, Akagawa was a professor at the Minneapolis College of Art and Design (MCAD), where he taught sculpture, printmaking, photography, video, installation and conceptual art.

Akagawa's work is exhibited nationally and internationally and is found in numerous public and private collections, including the National Gallery of Art, Washington, D.C.; the Smithsonian Institution, Washington, D.C.; the Los Angeles County Museum of Art; Norton Simon Museum, Pasadena, California; Minneapolis Institute of Art; the Walker Art Center, Minneapolis; the University of Iowa Museum of Art, Iowa City; and the Ackland Art Museum, Chapel Hill, N.C.

Notable public artworks include "Peace Garden Bridge" (2009), a collaboration with American architect Jerry Allan, in the Lyndale Park Peace Garden, Minneapolis; "Garden Seating, Thinking, Reading" (1987), in the Minneapolis Sculpture Garden; "Bayou Sculpture" (1985), Houston, Texas; and "Four Seasons with a Sundial" (1984), Tettegouche State Park, near Silver Bay, Minnesota.

Akagawa's awards and recognitions include the McKnight Foundation Distinguished Artist Award  (2007); Minnesota State Arts Board cultural collaborations grant (1995); Carnegie Mellon Foundation faculty enrichment grant (1984); McKnight Foundation Artist Fellowship (1983); Bush Foundation Fellowship (1982); and a Ford Foundation Fellowship (1965).

Akagawa lives and maintains a studio in Afton, Minnesota. He is married to fiber artist Nancy Gipple.

Notes

References

 Abbe, Mary. "Artful Legacy." Star Tribune, January 22, 2009.
 Byrne, J. Kevin. "Kinji 101: A philosophically-minded primer-cum-tribute to acclaimed artist and educator Kinji Akagawa." MN ARTISTS (February 18, 2011).
 Combs, Marianne, "Professor Teaches Students the Art of Living," MPR NewsQ, Minnesota Public Radio, February 5, 2009.
 Higgens, Hannah. "Kinji Akagawa--Artistic Journey from the Egotistical Self to the Eco-tistical Self: Shifting the Focus from Maker to Relationship" Art Journal (April 2006).
 Makholm, Kristin, Paradigm Shift. Exh. cat. Minneapolis College of Art and Design, 2009.
 Randall, Cynde. "Rivers Merging: Ten Cross-cultural Teams of Minnesota Artists Investigate the Meanings of Representation and Identity." Arts 18, no. 5 (May 1995): 6-7.
 Riddle, Mason. "Platform." Architecture Minnesota Magazine 34, no.2 (March–April 2008): 17-20.
 Schmelzer, Paul. "A Meadering Walk with Kinji Akagawa." Interview. Walker (April 2006).
 _. "How Care Manifests the World." Eyeteeth, October 31, 2007.
 "What Art Can Be - A Restful 'Front Porch' on Campus." Pieces of Eight (Greenville, N.C.), September 1, 1986.

External links
 2007 McKnight Distinguished Artist catalogue (PDF)
 Minneapolis College of Art and Design
 Kinji Akagawa at the Minneapolis Sculpture Garden
 Kinji Akagawa at Highpoint Center for Printmaking, Minneapolis
 Kinji Akagawa----Artcyclopedia
 Featured on the "MN Original" artist profile series produced by TPT (Twin Cities Public Television): MN Original Video

20th-century American sculptors
21st-century American sculptors
American male sculptors
Cranbrook Academy of Art alumni
Minneapolis College of Art and Design alumni
University of Minnesota alumni
American artists of Japanese descent
People from Tokyo
Japanese emigrants to the United States
Living people
1940 births
20th-century American printmakers
Sculptors from Minnesota
20th-century American male artists